Kappa Pyxidis, Latinized from κ Pyxidis, is a single, orange-hued star in the southern constellation of Pyxis. It is visible to the naked eye as a faint point of light with an apparent visual magnitude of +4.62. It is moving through space at the rate of 53.7 km/s relative to the Sun and is following an orbit through the Milky Way galaxy with a large eccentricity of 0.68

This is an aging giant with a stellar classification of K4III, having exhausted the supply of hydrogen at its core then expanded and cooled. At present it has 67 times the radius of the Sun. It is a variable star of uncertain type, changing brightness with an amplitude of 0.0058 in visual magnitude over a period of 8.5 days.

References

K-type giants
Pyxidis, Kappa
Pyxis (constellation)
Durchmusterung objects
078541
044824
3628